AASD may refer to:

Schools:
 Altoona Area School District, a public school district in Pennsylvania, United States
 Appleton Area School District, a school district in Wisconsin, United States
 Atlanta Area School for the Deaf, a school for the Deaf in Georgia, United States

Other uses:
 Applied Agile Software Development, a software development method